Mineral County Airport  is a county-owned public-use airport located two nautical miles (3.7 km) southeast of the central business district of Superior, a town in Mineral County, Montana, United States.   According to the FAA's National Plan of Integrated Airport Systems for 2011–2015, it is categorized as a general aviation facility.

Facilities and aircraft 
It has one runway designated 12/30 with an asphalt surface measuring 3,450 by 75 feet (1,052 x 23 m).

For the 12-month period ending 8 August 2013, the airport had 4,000 aircraft operations, an average of 11 per day, all of which were general aviation. At that time there were 12 aircraft based at this airport, all of which were single-engine.

References

External links 
 Aerial image as of 19 August 1995 from USGS The National Map
 

Airports in Montana
Buildings and structures in Mineral County, Montana
Transportation in Mineral County, Montana